Daniele Rimpelli (Reggio Emilia, 23 June 1997) is an Italian rugby union player.
His usual position is as a Prop and he currently plays for Zebre in Pro14.

Under contract with Calvisano, for 2017–18 Pro14 season, he was named a Permit Player for Zebre in Pro 14.

In 2016 and 2017, Rimpelli was named in the Italy Under 20 squad. 

From January 2021 he was named in Italy squad.

References

External links 
 It's Rugby France profile
 Player Profile
 Updating on Daniele Rimpelli

1997 births
Italian rugby union players
Zebre Parma players
Rugby union props
Living people
Italy international rugby union players
Rugby Calvisano players
Sportspeople from Reggio Emilia